Nalinaksha Sanyal (1898 – 29 October 1987) was an Indian politician, economist and freedom fighter.

Education
He studied at Krishnath College, Baharampur, and Presidency College, Kolkata, and taught economics at Krishnath College. He earned a master's degree from the London School of Economics and secured a PhD in economics from London University after carrying out research under Harold Laski.

Political career
While in London, Sanyal served on several committees for the London branch of the Indian National Congress, a banned organization. He was arrested twice for his participation. Sanyal returned to India to become a professor at Calcutta University, but the government disallowed his appointment because of his activism. Sanyal took a position with insurance companies New India Assurance Co., the Metropolitan Assurance Co., and the Hindustan Co-operative Society Ltd.

Sanyal continued to actively protest against British colonial rule and was imprisoned seven times.  He was elected to the Bengal Assembly and served as Chief Whip of the Indian National Congress of undivided Bengal, prior to the partition of the province. He was a vocal critic of the colonial government's policies during the Bengal Famine in 1943. In 1946, Sanyal was at the forefront of efforts to avoid the Partition of India. His suggestion of a loose federation was widely circulated and debated but was ultimately not adopted. When India was partitioned in 1947, he and Atulya Ghosh were able to convince the British to leave Maldah district in India (the area had a population that was evenly divided between Hindus and Muslims).

After the independence, Sanyal remained an active force in building the new India and held many senior positions in government as well as represented India in international bodies. In 1968 he established Karimpur Pannadevi College at Karimpur, Nadia district.

Social activities 
Sanyal was a modern personality and free thinker in his time. He married in 1924 with daughter of Sharat Chandra Bhattacharya of Baharampur without any rituals. He was strongly against dowry, castism, religious formalities. Even being a Brahmin he invited his Muslim friend Kazi Nazrul Islam to his marriage ceremony ignoring the social policing and restrictions. He established Dhoradaha RajaniKanta High School in 1961 at Dhoradaha in his father's name. After that in 1968 he established Karimpur Pannadevi College at Karimpur.

References

Biography: Nalinaksha Sanyal, Haripura Congress Souvenir, 1938
Development of Indian Railways, Calcutta University Press 1930
Krishnath College, Behrampore

1898 births
Year of death missing
West Bengal MLAs 1967–1969
West Bengal MLAs 1969–1971
Indian National Congress politicians from West Bengal
Indian independence activists from West Bengal
University of Calcutta alumni
Academic staff of the University of Calcutta
Alumni of the London School of Economics
People from Nadia district
Krishnath College alumni
Bangla Congress politicians